I Am Guilty is a 2005 German drama film directed by Christoph Hochhäusler. It was screened in the Un Certain Regard section at the 2005 Cannes Film Festival.

Cast
 Constantin von Jascheroff - Armin Steeb
 Manfred Zapatka - Martin Steeb
 Victoria Trauttmansdorff - Marianne Steeb
 Nora von Waldstätten - Katja Fichtner
 Devid Striesow - Martin Steeb jr.
 Florian Panzner - Stefan Steeb
 Thomas Dannemann - Herr Kleine
 Laura Tonke - Christiane Steeb
 Dennis Prinz - Ulrich Wendt
 Martin Kiefer - Richard Gassner
 Walter Gontermann - Herr Hülsmann
 Jörg Pose - Herr Esken
 Thomas Meinhardt - Ernst Matuschek
 Wieslawa Wesolowska - Josy Matuscheck
 Max Limper - Lederboy

References

External links

2005 films
2000s German-language films
2005 drama films
Films directed by Christoph Hochhäusler
German drama films
2000s German films